Bought & Sold is a 2016 memoir book by Megan Stephens and published by HarperCollins.

Synopsis
Bought & Sold is memoir by Megan Stephens about her experiences as a 14 year old girl who fell in love and was sold in sexual slavery by her pimp boyfriend.

References

External links 

 Publisher's official page

2016 non-fiction books
English-language books
British memoirs
Non-fiction books about British prostitution
Works about prostitution in Greece
HarperCollins books